Oxfordshire Rising may refer to:

 Buckinghamshire and Oxfordshire rising of 1549
 Oxfordshire rising of 1596